César Dario Gutiérrez [goo-te-er'-rez] (January 26, 1943 – January 22, 2005), also nicknamed "Cocoa", was a Venezuelan professional baseball player. He played as a shortstop in Major League Baseball for the San Francisco Giants in the 1967 and 1969 seasons, and for the Detroit Tigers from 1969 to 1971. Listed at 5'9" and 155 lbs, he batted and threw right handed. Gutiérrez is notable for being the second player in Major League history to record seven hits in a game without making an out.

Career
Born in Coro, Falcón, Gutiérrez was signed by the Pittsburgh Pirates as an amateur free agent in 1960. He was released in 1962, then was signed by the Giants before the 1963 season. Gutiérrez hit a combined .182 average in just 33 games for the Giants in parts of two seasons, before being traded to Detroit during the 1969 midseason.

His most productive season came in 1970 with the Tigers, when he became the everyday shortstop for the team, while posting career-highs in batting average (.243), RBI (22), runs (40), hits (101), doubles (11), triples (6), stolen bases (4) and games played (135), although he committed 23 errors for the third highest total in the league.

On June 21, 1970 in the second game of a doubleheader against the Cleveland Indians, Gutiérrez collected seven hits in seven at bats including a double, to become the second player in Major League history, after Wilbert Robinson, to record seven hits in a game without making an out. The Tigers won 9–8 in twelve innings, as his batting average went up 31 points that day, from .218 to .249.

Nevertheless, in 1971, Gutiérrez lost his regular shortstop position to Ed Brinkman, who had been acquired in a blockbuster six-player trade with the Washington Senators in the off-season. He played 40 games as a utility infielder for Detroit, batting only .189. Gutiérrez was sold to the Montreal Expos prior to the start of the next season, being assigned to their Triple-A affiliate, the Peninsula Whips, where after playing in only 12 games he was then released and picked up by the San Diego Padres, who assigned him to their Triple-A Hawaii Islanders affiliate club. Gutiérrez played the rest of the 1972 season in Hawaii, and retired at the end of the year.

Career statistics
In a four-year career, Gutiérrez played in 223 games, accumulating 128 hits in 545 at bats for a .235 career batting average and 26 runs batted in without home runs. He ended his career with a .953 fielding percentage.

In between, Gutiérrez played winter baseball in the Venezuelan League from 1961 to 1976. He later became a manager in the Mexican League, and served as a coach and scout with several teams.

Gutiérrez died in Cabimas, Zulia State, Venezuela, four days short of his 62nd birthday.

See also
 List of Major League Baseball players from Venezuela
 List of Major League Baseball hit records
List of Major League Baseball single-game hits leaders

References

External links

Retrosheet

1943 births
2005 deaths
Águilas del Zulia players
Baseball coaches
Cardenales de Lara players
Detroit Tigers players
El Paso Sun Kings players
Fresno Giants players
Hawaii Islanders players
Hobbs Pirates players
Johnson City Phillies players
Leones del Caracas players
Lexington Giants players
Major League Baseball shortstops
Major League Baseball players from Venezuela
Minor league baseball managers
Navegantes del Magallanes players
Peninsula Whips players
People from Falcón
Phoenix Giants players
San Francisco Giants players
Tigres de Aragua players
Venezuelan expatriate baseball players in the United States